Deep Silver Volition, LLC (formerly Parallax Software Corporation and Volition, Inc.) is an American video game developer based in Champaign, Illinois. Mike Kulas and Matt Toschlog founded the company as Parallax Software in June 1993, developing Descent and Descent II. By the time the sequel was completed, Toschlog had relocated to Ann Arbor, Michigan, with some employees to operate a satellite studio for Parallax. Kulas and Toschlog decided to split up the company, with Toschlog establishing Outrage Entertainment and Kulas staying with Parallax, which was renamed Volition in November 1996. With publisher Interplay Entertainment, Volition created Descent: FreeSpace – The Great War and its sequel, FreeSpace 2. The two companies parted ways during the development of Summoner.

Volition found a new publisher in THQ, which acquired the studio in August 2000 and released the game shortly thereafter. Under THQ, Volition created the Red Faction and Saints Row series, developing four entries in each series. During the development of Saints Row IV, THQ filed for bankruptcy in December 2012. In the subsequent proceedings, Volition and the Saints Row intellectual property (IP) were sold to Koch Media (now Plaion) and became part of the company's Deep Silver label. Meanwhile, Nordic Games acquired other THQ assets, including Summoner and Red Faction. Volition reconnected with these IPs when Koch Media was acquired by Nordic Games' parent company (later known as Embracer Group) in February 2018. The studio developed two less successful games with 2017's Agents of Mayhem and the 2022 Saints Row reboot. In November 2022,  Volition was transferred to Gearbox Entertainment, another operative group within the Embracer Group.

History

Parallax Software and Descent (1993–1996) 

Parallax Software was founded on June 14, 1993, by Mike Kulas and Matt Toschlog. The company was incorporated under the name Parallax Software Corporation. Both founders were programmers who had previously worked together on Car and Driver. This led them to consider launching their own game development company, knowing that, should they fail, they would have to return to working for other's companies. To reach a lower cost-of-living, Toschlog moved from Boston to Champaign, Illinois, where Kulas resided, and the two launched Parallax Software. Early on, they hired programmers John Slagel and Che-Yuan Wang, of which Wang also worked on level design. The team developed a rough concept for a game called Inferno, which they pitched to Apogee Software, the primary publisher of id Software. Apogee began funding the game's development, though the funds did not suffice for the company over time.

Because the team lacked an artist, Adam Pletcher was hired in January 1994. Shortly thereafter, Apogee dropped the project after it had been in development for seven months, though leaving Parallax with an already funded, functional prototype. Subsequently, while the studio was slowly running out of money, they produced a demo reel of the game and set it as a VHS tape to various publishers. Three companies—Accolade, Trimark Interactive and Interplay Productions (where it was championed by Rusty Buchert)—offered to publish the game, of which Parallax chose Interplay. Jasen Whiteside then became Parallax's eighth employee, working on level design while studying industrial design at school. With the studio lacking a quality assurance department, the game was tested by the entire team. As Interplay's funds had also dried up, Parallax refused to ask them for more, not wanting to show signs of weakness. Instead, Kulas and Toschlog invested their own money into the continued development. Inferno, now titled Descent, was released in March 1995 to widespread attention.

By the time Parallax began development on another Descent game, the team had grown to about 14 people. Interplay wished for the studio to develop a "CD-enhanced" version of the game, which would include high-resolution textures, cutscenes and Red Book-quality audio, as well as several new levels. Interplay marketed the game as a new game, Descent II, so they could make more profit than they would have from a simple derivate version of the same game, and could publish a new game under the same contract they had with Parallax. As a result, Parallax profited heavily from Descent II success.

Creation of Volition (1996–1997) 
Although Toschlog had moved to Champaign from Boston, he did not want to stay in Champaign long-term. During the development of Descent II, he and three designers moved to Ann Arbor, Michigan, to open a second office for Parallax. At the new office, Toschlog also hired two further programmers. After Descent II had shipped, the team came to the conclusion that working on the same game out of two distant offices had adverse effects on the team, where Toschlog and Kulas agreed to move the company to one office. However, they could not decide on where they should move the company, so they instead opted to split the company in half, a move they were able to pursue due to Descent success. Thus, half of Parallax' employees followed Toschlog to Michigan, where Toschlog formed Outrage Entertainment, while Kulas stayed with the main Parallax office in Champaign.

As Kulas' company was to receive a new name, he asked the remaining team for ideas. When he found that he liked none of the proposals, he sat down in his living room, pulling books from a shelf and looking through dictionaries and reference books' glossaries for a possible name. In one such glossary, he found the word "", described as "an intense active will to accomplish something". As he drew a connection between this definition and the act of software development, he chose "Volition" to be the new company name. He pitched the name and its definition to the company's employees, asking them to create a suitable logo. Of the many entries submitted, the one that was chosen was designed by Whiteside and inspired by the logo of Wax Trax! Records, while Pletcher created a font to display the company name with. The logo has been in use since. Formally, Volition was founded in October 1996 with twelve members, and the split was announced on December 1, 1997, with both companies having been organized into new corporate entities (wherein Volition was Volition, Inc.) and wholly owned by their respective leads.

FreeSpace and Summoner, THQ acquisition (1997–2000) 
Following the split, Volition and Outrage signed with Interplay for two further projects each. Their first project under the new name was Descent: FreeSpace – The Great War (or simply FreeSpace), a game that was set to improve on the concepts of games like Star Wars: X-Wing and Star Wars: TIE Fighter. During the development of FreeSpace, the Volition team doubled in size, adding about five or six people to the studio. During this time many team members were allocated to training the new employees. Meanwhile, Kulas, as the sole manager of the company, had to divide his time between programming and managing the business; consequently, should any business matter come up, his portion of the programming work stood still. FreeSpace was the last Volition game Kulas would significantly do programming work on. Following the release of FreeSpace, Volition began work on four projects—FreeSpace 2, Descent 4, Tube Racer and Summoner. The first, FreeSpace 2, was developed within a year. When the game's development had about three months to go, Interplay, who had recently become a public company, urged Volition to complete the game within a month. While the game was completed within the month, Interplay did not adjust their advertisement strategy. As a result, the game sold poorly and was only marginally profitable. Tube Racers was canceled about six to nine months in development.

Descent 4 was to be the fourth main entry in the Descent series (the third game, Descent 3, was in development simultaneously at Outrage). As the Descent 3 release date came closer, Interplay began having financial difficulties. When the game launched in June 1999, it also did not sell well. The two companies separated on Volition's suggestion. Interplay owned the publishing rights to the Descent franchise, and as a result Volition could not publish Descent 4 with a different publisher. Instead, they reused much of the code and tools they had created for the game and used it to create Red Faction.

Summoner, unlike other games by Parallax and Volition, was developed as a role-playing video game, a genre the development team had no experience with. The team were later provided with a development kit for the PlayStation 2, and were tasked with making Summoner a launch title for the console. Meanwhile, the four-game deal with Interplay was winding down, and Volition required a new publisher for Summoner. On August 31, 2000, they were acquired by THQ, who also overtook the game's publishing duties. THQ also acquired Outrage in April 2002, though closed that studio by 2004. Following a troubled development cycle, Summoner eventually hit the intended release date in October 2000, but shipped in a flawed state that resulted from the technical discrepancies between personal computers and PlayStation 2, between which the studio had to port the game.

Red Faction, Summoner II and The Punisher (2000–2005) 
After Volition had started to develop Red Faction out of what had been Descent 4, many people on the team felt like the game was a "ground-pounder", a game they would work hard on just to get an unpleasant result. The game shifted from a space combat game to a first-person shooter with a heavy focus on environmental destruction. Much like Summoner, Red Faction was first developed for personal computers before moving to consoles. When Kulas attempted to write a part of the game's code, he found himself writing code for personal computers, having to rewrite everything should it work on consoles. The game was delayed for two months shortly before release to allow the team to polish the game before it shipped. The game went gold shortly thereafter, and received positive reviews, much to the surprise of the development team. Following Red Faction, Volition developed Summoner 2, aiming at fixing all flaws made in the first game. While it was received better than the first game, it also sold fewer copies. After that came Red Faction II, which was ultimately not reviewed as good as the first game, again to the team's surprise. Internally, Red Faction II was considered a failure, and the series was halted. Ports of the game, released in 2003, were developed by fellow THQ studios Outrage (for Windows and Xbox) and Cranky Pants Games (for GameCube). A third Red Faction game was already in development, but was consequently canceled. A third Summoner game was also canceled. Following these cancellations, their teams started development on a heist-style game called Underground. The team worked on the game for about twelve months, but when Grand Theft Auto III was released, the marketing department at THQ pushed the expectations for the game so high that they could not be met, wherefore Underground, too, was canceled.

Following Underground cancellation, THQ approached Volition and asked them whether they were willing to create a licensed game. The publisher suggested that they would create a game around Marvel Comics character Punisher, who had a movie coming up, which the studio agreed to. The development team had excursed to Marvel's film studios and were on set, talking to stage designers and witnessing some of the scenes being shot. Meanwhile, in 2003, as the studio grew to 30–40 employees, Kulas hired Dan Cermak as vice-president for the company, who then implemented a new company structure to replace its previous flat hierarchy. As the game neared completion, it was submitted to the Entertainment Software Rating Board (ESRB), which, as the game re-enacted the Punisher's violent interrogation methods, deemed the game to be more of a torture simulator than a game. Some elements were adjusted so that the game could pass the ESRB with a "Mature" rating.

Saints Row (2006–2008) 
At one point, Volition held a design exercise, inviting staff members to submit ideas for a new game. One such idea was a hybrid between a first-person shooter and a "gang simulator", a genre unexplored by most games at the time. A trailer was put together by taking snippets from various movies and games, underlaid with the song "Fuck tha Police", and after it was showcased in their board room, THQ's chief financial officer stepped forward, stating that this would be a game they were willing to develop. Volition imposed several rules on the game, such as the exclusion of children and the inability to kill the police, so to not generate too much controversy. The team shifted away from developing in wide arrays of genres, instead focusing the entire studio's talent on one design principle: open world. The game, initially known as Bling Bling, was disliked by many of Volition's employees who either did not want to be associated with a gang simulator or thought that their work on the game was not worthwhile. The studio faced further trouble as they switched from the PlayStation 2 to the Xbox 360, because the documentation provided with the Xbox 360 was incomplete, and the final hardware specifications for it unknown.

After the game, now titled Saints Row, was finished, the team was asked to write postmortem documentations, which presented a lot of negative views on the game, as well as criticism with the management. When the game was released and sold well, it was decided that Volition would develop another such game, which would become Saints Row 2. Saints Row 2 differed from its predecessor in that it was more sandbox-oriented and more infused with humor, which the first game almost completely lacked.

Return to Red Faction, Saints Row: The Third and Insane (2009–2012) 
Kulas had wished to return to developing a game centered around destruction, either through Red Faction or through a new intellectual property, now that console hardware had been advanced enough to handle such gameplay. Thus, the studio decided to develop a new Red Faction game, Red Faction: Guerrilla. From the poor reception of Red Faction II, the team had learned that destruction-based gameplay was not a good fit for a shooter set in narrow, enclosed corridors, wherefore the team opted for an open world instead. The game's development cycle lasted roughly five years. While Guerrilla was set on Mars, the next installment in the franchise, Red Faction: Armageddon, went in the other direction by being set inside a cave. A third game in the Saints Row franchise, Saints Row 3, was announced in February 2009. The game stripped away many features included in its predecessor to make for a more focused but overall still "over-the-top" experience. Under the name Saints Row: The Third, the game was released in November 2011.

In December 2010, at that year's Spike Video Game Awards, film director Guillermo del Toro took the stage to announce Insane, a horror game developed in partnership with Volition, projecting a 2013 release date. del Toro later revealed that Insane would become a trilogy, with total development time spanning one decade. However, in August 2012, THQ announced that Insane had been canceled.

In April 2011, it was announced that Kulas was retiring from the company, effective on May 2, with Cermak taking over his position as general manager. Following his retirement, he "goofed off" for about four years before he got back together with Toschlog, founding a new studio, Revival Productions, in 2014. The new company went to develop a spiritual successor to Descent named Overload, which was funded through a crowdfunding campaign held on Kickstarter and released in May 2018.

Acquisition by Deep Silver (2013) 
In December 2012, THQ filed for Chapter 11 bankruptcy. As the publisher's assets were to be sold off, Koch Media offered a  bid for Volition. As a result, Volition's operations were transitioned into a new legal entity, named Deep Silver Volition, LLC. In April 2014, DS Volition sought "incentives" from Champaign to remodel. If it met the city's goals, it could have received up to $200,000.

With the purchase of Koch Media by THQ Nordic (now Embracer Group) in February 2018, Volition and their IPs were reunited under one company; responsibility for  the Red Faction franchise would be moved directly into Deep Silver in May 2020.

Saints Row IV and Agents of Mayhem, layoffs 
A fourth Saints Row game, Saints Row IV, was released in August 2013. In September 2014, creative director Steve Jaros left Volition to join Valve. An expansion to Saints Row IV, titled Saints Row: Gat out of Hell and developed in partnership with High Voltage Software, was released in January 2015.

Following Saints Row IV, Volition developed Agents of Mayhem, a game set in the Saints Row universe, featuring similar gameplay mechanics while being unconnected to the main series. The game released in August 2017 to mixed reviews and poor sales. As a result, about 30 positions, including Cermak, were cut from the studio's previously 200-people-strong workforce. Jim Boone, who had been part of Parallax in 1994, succeeded Cermak as studio development director in October. On December 31, Volition's staff count was 148. In January 2019, Kulas announced his return to Volition as general manager. At the time, Revival Productions was winding down, and when Kulas wondered what to do next, fearing he would end up not doing anything for four years, he decided to re-join the studio after eight years. According to Kulas, his time as an indie developer at Revival helped him "come up to speed on all kinds of stuff".

Saints Row reboot, transfer to Gearbox 
By August 2019, Volition was "deep in development" on a new installment in the Saints Row franchise, later revealed to be a reboot of the franchise. At this time, it had 174 employees, and had close to 230 in March 2021. In November 2022, after the Saints Row reboot was met with a mixed and "polarized" response, Embracer announced that it would transfer Volition from Deep Silver to Gearbox (which it acquired in 2021) to leverage its resources and expertise. It marked the first time that Embracer Group had transferred a studio between one of its operative groups.

Games developed

References

External links 
 

1993 establishments in Illinois
2000 mergers and acquisitions
American companies established in 1993
American subsidiaries of foreign companies
Champaign, Illinois
Companies based in Champaign County, Illinois
Deep Silver
Video game companies established in 1993
Video game companies of the United States
Video game development companies